Joannes Cuppari also Ivan Cupareo (9 September 1635 – 1694) was a Roman Catholic prelate who served as Bishop of Trogir (1684–1694).

Biography
Joannes Cuppari was born in Split, Croatia on 9 September 1635. He was ordained a deacon on 8 August 1661 and ordained a priest on 10 August 1661. On 19 June 1684, he was appointed during the papacy of Pope Innocent XI as Bishop of Trogir. On 25 June 1684, he was consecrated bishop by Alessandro Crescenzi (cardinal), Cardinal-Priest of Santa Prisca, with Giuseppe Bologna, Archbishop Emeritus of Benevento, and Francesco Maria Giannotti, Bishop of Segni, serving as co-consecrators. He served as Bishop of Trogir until his death in 1694.

References

External links and additional sources
 (for Chronology of Bishops)
 (for Chronology of Bishops)

17th-century Roman Catholic bishops in Croatia
Bishops appointed by Pope Innocent XI
Cuppari, Joannes
1635 births
1694 deaths